Jerry Maguire is a 1996 American romantic sports comedy-drama film written, produced, and directed by Cameron Crowe; it stars Tom Cruise, Cuba Gooding Jr., Renée Zellweger, and Regina King. Produced in part by James L. Brooks, it was inspired by an experience sports agent Leigh Steinberg (who acted as technical consultant for the film) had with client Tim McDonald during the 1993 NFL season when free agency was introduced to the league. The film was also partly inspired by a 28-page memo written at Disney in 1991 by Jeffrey Katzenberg. It was released in North American theaters on December 13, 1996, produced by Gracie Films, and distributed by TriStar Pictures.

The film received generally favorable reviews from critics, who praised its performances and screenplay. It was also a financial success, grossing more than $273 million worldwide against its $50 million budget. It was the ninth-highest-grossing film of 1996. Over the years, the film had gained significant cult following and has notably spawned a large number of catch phrases into popular culture, most prominently "Show me the money!" and "You had me at 'Hello'" (which were deemed the 25th and 52nd most memorable American movie quotations of all time, respectively in a 2005 survey by the American Film Institute). It also included "You complete me", "Help me help you", and other quotations.

The film was nominated for five Academy Awards, including Best Picture and Best Actor for Tom Cruise, with Cuba Gooding Jr. winning Best Supporting Actor. It also received nominations for three Golden Globes, with Cruise winning for Best Actor - Motion Picture Musical or Comedy, and three Screen Actors Guild Awards, with Gooding winning Best Supporting Actor.

Plot
Jerry Maguire is a slick 35-year-old sports agent working for Sports Management International (SMI). After criticism from an injured player's son triggers a life-altering epiphany, he writes a mission statement about perceived dishonesty in the sports management business and his desire to work with fewer clients to produce a better, more caring personal relationship with them. In turn, SMI management sends Bob Sugar, Jerry's protégé, to fire him. This spurs Jerry and Sugar to each call all of Jerry's clients to try to convince them not to hire the services of the other. Jerry speaks to Arizona Cardinals wide receiver Rod Tidwell, one of his clients who is disgruntled with his contract. He needs a $10 million contract for his family to live on. Jerry informs him if he gets injured for the season, he will get no money from the Cardinals. Rod tests Jerry's resolve through a very long telephone conversation, during which Bob Sugar persuades the rest of Jerry's clients to stick with SMI.

Leaving the office, Jerry announces that he will start his own agency and asks if anyone will join him, to which only 26-year-old single mother Dorothy Boyd agrees. Frank "Cush" Cushman, a superstar quarterback prospect who expects to be the number one pick in the NFL Draft, initially also stays with Jerry after he makes a visit to the Cushman home. However, Sugar persuades Cushman and his father to sign with SMI over Jerry the night before the draft.

After an argument Jerry breaks up with his disgruntled fiancée Avery. He then turns to Dorothy, becoming closer to her young son, Ray, and starts a relationship with her. Dorothy contemplates moving to San Diego as she has a secure job offer there; however, she and Jerry get married. Jerry concentrates all his efforts on Rod, now his only client, who turns out to be very difficult to satisfy. Over the next several months, the two direct harsh criticism towards each other with Rod claiming that Jerry is not trying hard enough to get him a contract while Jerry claims that Rod is not proving himself worthy of the money for which he asks; one point of contention is that Rod is not very likable and comes across as aloof to the fans. Rod takes Jerry's advice to prove he is worthy of his contract. Rod is playing well and his team is winning. Jerry's marriage with Dorothy deteriorates and they separate.

During a December Monday Night Football game between the Cardinals and the Dallas Cowboys, Rod plays well but appears to receive a serious injury when catching a winning touchdown, securing a spot for the Cardinals in the playoffs. He recovers and dances for the wildly cheering crowd. Afterwards, Jerry and Rod embrace in front of other athletes and sports agents and show how their relationship has progressed from a strictly business one to a close personal one, which was one of the points Jerry made in his mission statement. He then flies back home to meet Dorothy, telling her that he loves her and wants her in his life, which she reciprocates. Rod appears on Roy Firestone's sports show. Unbeknownst to him, Jerry has secured him an $11.2 million contract with the Cardinals, allowing him to finish his pro football career in Arizona. The emotional Rod proceeds to thank everyone and extends warm gratitude to Jerry. Jerry speaks with several other pro athletes, some of whom have read his earlier mission statement and respect his work with Rod.

The film concludes with Ray throwing a baseball in the air which surprises Jerry; Jerry speaks of Ray's possible future sports industry career with Dorothy.

Cast

As Themselves

Cameron Crowe originally wrote the screenplay for Tom Hanks. Crowe took so long to write the screenplay that by the time the film was ready to be made, he thought Hanks was too old to play the part. Woody Harrelson was offered the role but turned it down. Rod Tidwell was partially modeled after Charley Taylor.

Janet Jackson auditioned and was initially accepted for the role of Marcee Tidwell, though it later went to Regina King, who previously co-starred in Janet Jackson's debut film Poetic Justice. Jackson is referenced twice in the film, with a Janet poster seen hanging in Teepee's room and Cuba Gooding Jr.'s character Rod Tidwell asking "What Have You Done for Me Lately?", paying homage to Jackson's hit of the same name.

Artie Lange filmed a scene for the movie but it was edited out of the final cut.

Patricia Arquette, Kate Beckinsale, Bridget Fonda, Winona Ryder, Marisa Tomei, Cameron Diaz, Uma Thurman and Jennifer Lopez were all considered for the part of Dorothy. Mira Sorvino was also considered for Dorothy but the producers would not meet her quote. The producers also considered Janeane Garofalo for the role of Dorothy but she was deemed too old for the part. Connie Britton auditioned for the role of Dorothy, and the choice was narrowed down to Zellweger and Britton, with Zellweger winning the part. Damon Wayans and Mykelti Williamson were considered for the role of Rod Tidwell. Jamie Foxx unsuccessfully auditioned for the role of Rod Tidwell. Diane Lane was considered for the role of Avery Bishop; however, the role was eventually given to Kelly Preston. Billy Wilder was considered for the part of Jerry's mentor Dicky Fox.

Product placement
TriStar received merchandise and marketing services of over $1.5 million from Reebok in exchange for incorporating a commercial into the film and depicting the Reebok brand within certain agreed-upon standards; when the film was theatrically released, the commercial had been left out and a tirade including "broadsides against Reebok" was included.  When the film aired on television, the Reebok commercial had been embedded into the film as originally agreed upon. The "Special Edition" DVD release of the film, which has the film's theatrical edit, includes the commercial as bonus content.

Release

Box office
Jerry Maguire debuted at number one. It earned $17,084,296 its opening weekend, and eventually grossed $153,952,592 in North American box office and approximately $119.6 million internationally for a $273,552,592 worldwide total, on a budget of $50 million.
It is the ninth top-grossing film of 1996 and the fourth highest-grossing romantic drama film of all time.

Critical response
On Rotten Tomatoes, Jerry Maguire has an approval rating of 84% based on reviews from 84 critics, with an average score of 7.80/10. Its consensus states: "Anchored by dazzling performances from Tom Cruise, Cuba Gooding Jr., and Renée Zellweger, as well as Cameron Crowe's tender direction, Jerry Maguire meshes romance and sports with panache." On Metacritic, the film has a weighted average score of 77 out of 100 based on reviews from 28 critics, indicating "generally favorable reviews". Audiences polled by CinemaScore gave the film an average grade of "A" on an A+ to F scale.

Cuba Gooding Jr. won an Academy Award for Best Supporting Actor for his portrayal of Rod Tidwell, the Arizona Cardinals football player who sticks with Maguire. Cruise was also nominated for Best Actor in a Leading Role and the movie marked Renée Zellweger's breakout role. The film itself was nominated for Best Picture, and crew members on the film were nominated for Best Original Screenplay and Best Film Editing awards.

Roger Ebert of the Chicago Sun-Times gave the film three out of four stars, writing that there "are so many subplots that Jerry Maguire seems too full" and also commented that the film "starts out looking cynical and quickly becomes a heartwarmer." Todd McCarthy of Variety wrote "An exceptionally tasty contempo comedic romance, Jerry Maguire runs an unusual pattern on its way to scoring an unexpected number of emotional, social and entertaining points. Smartly written and boasting a sensational cast, Cameron Crowe's shrewdly observed third feature also gives Tom Cruise one of his very best roles..."

Former Green Bay Packers vice president Andrew Brandt said that the film "accurately portrayed the cutthroat nature of the agent business, especially the lengths to which agents will go to retain or pilfer clients. It also captured the financial, emotional and psychological investment that goes far beyond negotiating contracts."

Accolades

The film's screenplay was later voted the 66th greatest ever written in a poll by the Writers Guild of America.

Home media
Jerry Maguire was first released on VHS and Laserdisc on May 29, 1997. 

It is the best selling VHS tape of all time which was not released by Disney. Over 3 million copies were sold during its first week of release. It was re-released on VHS in the late 90s. In its first week of release on VHS to stores and video stores in 1997, it made $80 million in sales and $7.6 million in rentals. The $80 million was split between video dealers and Columbia TriStar Home Video.

The film was first released onto DVD on June 24, 1997 and around 2002 respectively in both a standard edition and a two-disc "Special Edition". While the standard edition contains no special features, the two-disc edition primarily includes deleted scenes, commentary tracks, featurettes, and a music video for Bruce Springsteen's "Secret Garden." The film was later released onto Blu-ray on September 9, 2008, with the same special features found on the second disc of the DVD "Special Edition." in 2008, The film was triple packed with A Few Good Men and Born on the Fourth of July by Sony Pictures Home Entertainment/Universal Pictures Home Entertainment in United Kingdom only. The film was double featured with Cliffhanger via DVD in 2008, and again double featured with A Few Good Men via DVD on December 29, 2009. Jerry Maguire was chosen to be released in 4k as part of the Columbia Classics Collection: vol. 1 alongside Mr. Smith Goes to Washington, Dr. Strangelove, Lawrence of Arabia, Gandhi, and A League of Their Own on June 16, 2020. Columbia Classics Collection: Volume 1 4K Blu-ray (UPDATED)

Legacy
Jerry Maguire spawned several popular quotations, including "Show me the money!" (shouted repeatedly in a phone exchange between Rod Tidwell and Jerry Maguire), "You complete me" , "Help me help you," "The key to this business is personal relationships" and "You had me at 'hello'" (said by Renée Zellweger's Dorothy Boyd after a lengthy romantic plea by Jerry Maguire), and "Kwan," a word used by Cuba Gooding Jr.'s Tidwell meaning love, respect, community, and money (also spelled "quan" and "quawn") to illustrate the difference between himself and other football players: "Other football players may have the coin, but they won't have the 'Kwan'." These lines are largely attributed to Cameron Crowe, director and screenwriter of the film. Zellweger said of filming the famous "hello" line, "Cameron had me say it a few different ways. It's so funny, because when I read it, I didn't get it–I thought it was a typo somehow. I kept looking at it. It was the one thing in the script that I was looking at going, 'Is that right? Can that be right? How is that right?' I thought, 'Is there a better way to say that? Am I not getting it? I just don't know how to do it.'" Brandt stated in 2014 that "I definitely noticed an uptick of young people becoming interested in the agent business after Jerry Maguire". "Some of what happened to the agent industry would have happened without 'Jerry,' but definitely not as fast as it did," noted Peter Schaffer, who has been a sports agent since 1988.

In June 2008, AFI revealed its "Ten Top Ten"—the best ten films in ten "classic" American film genres—after polling over 1,500 people from the creative community. Jerry Maguire was acknowledged as the tenth best film in the sports genre. It was also voted by AFI as #100 on its list of 100 Passions. The quotes "Show me the money!" and "You had me at 'hello'" were also ranked by AFI on its list of 100 Movie Quotes, ranked #25 and #52 respectively.

American Film Institute Lists
 AFI's 100 Years...100 Movies– Nominated
 AFI's 100 Years...100 Laughs– Nominated
 AFI's 100 Years...100 Passions– #100
 AFI's 100 Years...100 Songs:
 Secret Garden– Nominated
 AFI's 100 Years...100 Movie Quotes:
 "Show me the money!" – #25
 "You had me at "hello."– #52
 "You complete me."–Nominated
 AFI's 100 Years...100 Cheers–Nominated
 AFI's 100 Years...100 Movies (10th Anniversary Edition) – Nominated
 AFI's 10 Top 10– #10 Sports Film (also nominated Romantic Comedy)

In June 2010, Entertainment Weekly named Jerry Maguire one of the 100 Greatest Characters of the Last 20 Years.

In 2017, the NFL produced two "A Football Life" mockumentaries to commemorate the film's 20th anniversary edition; they portray the careers of Rod Tidwell and Frank Cushman after the events of the film. Beau Bridges, Jay Mohr, Jerry O'Connell, and Aries Spears reprised their roles from the film, along with Roy Firestone and several real-life sports figures, including Shaquille O'Neal.  According to the fictional history, Cushman retired after only four years due to a severe case of athlete's foot, and devoted himself to charity work with children with the same affliction; Tidwell was offered an even more lucrative contract, but declined, declaring that the "quan" was not there, and he preferred to devote more time to his family. The Tidwell mockumentary also features an adult Ray Boyd, inspired by Jerry and Rod to own his own boxing gym.

Soundtrack
The motion picture soundtrack CD includes:

Music not on the soundtrack
Includes:
 AC/DC – "For Those About to Rock (We Salute You)"
 Herb Alpert & The Tijuana Brass – "The Lonely Bull"
 The Durutti Column – "Requiem Again"
 L.V. - "The Wrong Come Up"
 Nirvana – "Something in the Way"
 Tom Petty – "Free Fallin'"
 The Replacements – "I'll Be You"
 The Rolling Stones – "Bitch"
 Merrilee Rush – "Angel of the Morning"
 Andy Partridge and Harold Budd – "Through the Hill"
 a clip of John Coltrane, Miles Davis, and Charles Mingus performing (Mingus' piece is "Haitian Fight Song")

"Secret Garden", originally a Bruce Springsteen track from 1995, was re-released in 1997 after its exposure in the film and on the soundtrack, and peaked at No. 19 on the Billboard Hot 100.

The film was scored by director Crowe's then-wife, Nancy Wilson who is a member of the rock band Heart.

Sequel
In a February 2021 interview, Cameron Crowe revealed that he had considered making a sequel to Jerry Maguire, and that he had been approached several times about making a TV series adaptation of the film. In both cases he felt that any continuation of the film's story should focus on Rod Tidwell and his family life with wife Marcee.

See also
 List of films featuring the deaf and hard of hearing

References

External links

 
 
 
 The Jerry Maguire Journal, a log kept by Crowe during the film's production and published in Rolling Stone in December 1996.
 "Things we think and do not say", the memo that led Maguire to establish his own agency. Archived from the original on November 9, 2012.
 Jerry Maguire, film script (text document)
 Leigh Steinberg (the agent based on Jerry Maguire) talks about Cameron Crowe and the film

1996 films
1996 comedy-drama films
1996 romantic comedy-drama films
1990s sports comedy-drama films
American business films
American football films
American romantic comedy-drama films
American sports comedy-drama films
Arizona Cardinals
Dallas Cowboys
1990s English-language films
Fictional talent agents
Films directed by Cameron Crowe
Films featuring a Best Musical or Comedy Actor Golden Globe winning performance
Films featuring a Best Supporting Actor Academy Award-winning performance
Films produced by Cameron Crowe
Films produced by Laurence Mark
Films with screenplays by Cameron Crowe
Films produced by James L. Brooks
Films set in Maricopa County, Arizona
Films shot in California
Films shot in Arizona
Films shot in New York (state)
Gracie Films films
TriStar Pictures films
Vinyl Films films
Films about mother–son relationships
1990s American films